Stephanos Bibas (born 1969) is an American lawyer and jurist who serves as a judge on the U.S. Court of Appeals for the Third Circuit. Before his appointment to the bench, Bibas was a professor of law and criminology and director of the Supreme Court clinic at the University of Pennsylvania Law School. He is a noted scholar of criminal procedure with expertise in criminal charging, plea bargaining, and sentencing. As a professor, Bibas examined how procedural rules written for jury trials have unintended consequences when cases involving jury trials are the exception, rather than the rule, with 95 percent of defendants pleading guilty. Bibas also studied the role of substantive goals such as remorse and apology in criminal procedure. Bibas has been praised for the quality of his legal writing.

Early life and education
Bibas was born in New York City and spent his summers growing up working for his father, a Greek immigrant who survived the occupation of Greece during World War II, in his family's restaurants. In high school, he became involved in debate and public speaking. He graduated high school at the age of 15 and entered Columbia University.

At Columbia, Bibas was a member of the Philolexian Society and participated in Parliamentary debate. He graduated from Columbia in 1989 at age 19 with a Bachelor of Arts summa cum laude in political theory. He then studied jurisprudence at University College, Oxford, receiving a Bachelor of Arts in 1991 (later promoted per tradition to a Master of Arts). While at Oxford, Bibas won the 1st place speaker award in the World Debate Championships.

Bibas then attended Yale Law School. Bibas joined the moot court team and won awards for the best oralist and best team, and also served as a symposium editor of the Yale Law Journal. He graduated from Yale with a Juris Doctor in 1994.

Professional career
From 1994 to 1995, Bibas was a law clerk for judge Patrick Higginbotham of the U.S. Court of Appeals for the Fifth Circuit. He worked in private practice with the law firm Covington & Burling from 1995 to 1997, then clerked for justice Anthony Kennedy of the U.S. Supreme Court from 1997 to 1998, where he was a co-clerk of Raymond Kethledge.

After his Supreme Court clerkship, Bibas was an Assistant United States Attorney for the Southern District of New York from 1998 to 2000. He successfully prosecuted the world's leading expert in Tiffany stained glass for hiring a grave robber to steal Tiffany windows from cemeteries. 

Bibas was a research fellow at Yale Law from 2000 to 2001, then became a professor at the University of Iowa College of Law. In 2006, Bibas moved to the University of Pennsylvania Law School. He received the Robert A. Gorman Award for Excellence in Teaching in 2008.

Bibas is the 15th-most-cited law professor by the U.S. Supreme Court, U.S. Courts of Appeals, and state high courts as well as the 5th-most-cited professor of criminal law and procedure by law professors.

Supreme Court clinic
Bibas also directed Penn Law's Supreme Court clinic, for which he litigated a wide range of appellate cases under consideration by the United States Supreme Court. The clinic allows students to assist on real Supreme Court cases, including recruiting, strategising, researching, writing briefs, participating in moot court rehearsals, and attending oral arguments at the Court itself. The Court appointed him to brief and argue Tapia v. United States as amicus curiae. The Court praised Bibas and the clinic for doing "an exceptionally good job" on that case.

Cases argued
 Encino Motorcars v. Navarro (2016)
 Bank of America v. Caulkett (2015)
 Petrella v. MGM, Inc. (2014)
 Vartelas v. Holder (2012)
 Tapia v. United States (2011)
 Turner v. Rogers (2011)

Federal judicial service

On June 19, 2017, President Donald Trump nominated Bibas to serve as a United States circuit judge of the United States Court of Appeals for the Third Circuit, to fill the seat vacated by Judge Midge Rendell, who assumed senior status on July 1, 2015. The American Bar Association rated him a unanimously “Well Qualified” nominee, its highest ranking. On October 4, 2017, a hearing on his nomination was held before the Senate Judiciary Committee. On October 26, 2017, his nomination was reported out of committee by an 11–9 vote. On November 2, 2017, the United States Senate invoked cloture on his nomination by a 54–43 vote. His nomination was confirmed on the same day by a 53–43 vote. He received his judicial commission on November 20, 2017. Judge Bibas also has sat by designation as a trial judge in the U.S. District Court for the District of Delaware.

According to a legal writing expert, “Judge Bibas is considered one of the best writers on the federal bench.” Bibas’s judicial writing style has been called “instantly recognizable”; its use of short, punchy sentences and colorful examples aims for "radical clarity." His writing style and typography have been praised as “point[ing] the way to opinions that are more professional-looking and readable.”  In a widely quoted speech, he argued that judges should write “in a way that ordinary citizens can understand.” Doing so helps the public see that “judges aren’t just politicians in robes.”

As covered in the Wall Street Journal, Bibas has stated: "My boss is not my chief judge. My boss is not my appointing president. My boss is the Constitution and the laws."

Circuit court opinions 

Bibas has authored over one hundred opinions for the Third Circuit on a wide range of subjects, including the following notable opinions:

 Donald J. Trump for President, Inc. v. Secretary Commonwealth of Pennsylvania, 830 F. App’x 377 (3d Cir. 2020). On November 27, 2020, Bibas authored the opinion in the case that rejected the 2020 Donald Trump presidential campaign's attempt to undo the certification of votes in the 2020 United States presidential election in Pennsylvania. Bibas opened his opinion by writing: "Free, fair elections are the lifeblood of our democracy. Charges of unfairness are serious. But calling an election unfair does not make it so. Charges require specific allegations and then proof. We have neither here."  Bibas concluded by stressing that "[v]oters, not lawyers, choose the President" and "[b]allots, not briefs, decide elections."
 Nekrilov v. City of Jersey City, 45 F.4th 662 (3d Cir. 2022). Judge Bibas concurred in a challenge to Jersey City’s restrictions on residents’ renting their homes through platforms like Airbnb. He proposed an originalist test for deciding when a regulation violates the Constitution’s Takings Clause.  He wrote that the government should “have to compensate [a property] owner whenever it takes a property right and presses it into public use—even if the taking did not involve a physical invasion.” Under that test, a regulation counts as a taking if it “take[s] a property right from the ‘collection of individual rights’ that ‘constitute property’” under state law.
 United States v. Ho Ka Terence Yung, 37 F.4th 70 (3d Cir. 2022). Writing for the court, Judge Bibas held that a federal law against cyberstalking was not overbroad in violation of the First Amendment. Judge Bibas acknowledged that the law “if read broadly” could “punish protected speech” that merely “annoys someone.” To avoid that constitutional problem, Judge Bibas adopted “a narrow reading of the statute[]” so that it targeted only those cyberstalkers who intended to “put the victim in fear of death or bodily injury.” In another part of the opinion, Judge Bibas explained that courts should not enforce plea bargains when doing so would prevent the defendant from appealing an illegal sentence.
 United States of America v. Safehouse, 985 F.3d 225 (3d Cir. 2021). Writing for the court, Judge Bibas held that a nonprofit “safe-injection site” would violate federal law. He reasoned that Congress had made it a crime to open a property to others for drug use. Though Congress may not have intended the law to cover safe-injection sites, that was “irrelevant”: “A court’s job is to parse texts, not psychoanalyze lawmakers.” The court also held that under Supreme Court precedent, the law at issue was a valid exercise of Congress’s commerce power.
 Ezaki Glico Kabushiki Kaisha v. Lotte International America Corp., 986 F.3d 250 (3d Cir. 2021). Writing for the court, Judge Bibas ruled that a cookie manufacturer’s “trade dress” (the distinctive look of its product) was not protected under trademark law. Trade-dress protection “does not safeguard designs that are functional—that is, useful.” So the cookie manufacturer could not get trade-dress protection for functional parts of its cookies’ design—like their shape—that made them easier to eat.
 Jacobs v. Federal Housing Finance Agency, 908 F.3d 884 (3d Cir. 2018). Writing for the court, Judge Bibas upheld, on statutory grounds, the creation of the Federal Housing Finance Agency (FHFA), a government conservator that took over Fannie Mae and Freddie Mac and helped rescue the nation's economy after the housing crisis of 2008, as well as the FHFA's ability to retain Fannie and Freddie's future net profits in exchange for taking on their crisis-era liabilities.
 E.O.H.C. v. Secretary U.S. Department of Homeland Security, 950 F.3d 177 (3d Cir. 2020). Writing for the court, Judge Bibas held that district courts have jurisdiction to hear a wide array of "now or never" challenges to the conditions of an immigrant detainee's confinement. Among them were the plaintiffs' challenges to (1) the Trump Administration's Migrant Protection Protocols (MPP) and (2) alleged violations of the Flores Settlement Agreement.
 McCafferty v. Newsweek Media Group, 955 F.3d 352 (3d Cir. 2020). Writing for the court, Judge Bibas affirmed, on First Amendment grounds, the dismissal of a defamation complaint against Newsweek brought by a twelve-year-old, politically vocal supporter of Donald Trump. Bibas wrote: "Political discourse can be bruising. People often express opinions that offend others. But the First Amendment protects virtually all of those opinions, even offensive and hurtful ones, to promote a greater good: robust political discourse. The price of free speech is putting up with all sorts of name-calling and hurtful rhetoric."
 Folajtar v. Attorney General of the United States, 980 F.3d 897 (3d Cir. 2020) (Bibas, J., dissenting). Judge Bibas dissented from a majority opinion that held that the government could, consistent with the Second Amendment, permanently ban gun possession by all felons, regardless of whether their crimes were violent or dangerous. Bibas canvassed the original history of the Second Amendment and historical laws that had limited the right to bear arms, ultimately concluding that a citizen’s dangerousness, not her virtuousness, is what separates those who can and cannot be denied the right to bear arms. Bibas would have thus held that the plaintiff, who had committed a non-violent felony many years prior, should not be denied her Second Amendment rights forever because “[f]elons are more than the wrongs they have done.” 
 Association of New Jersey Rifle & Pistol Clubs v. Attorney General of New Jersey, 910 F.3d 106 (3d Cir. 2018) (Bibas, J., dissenting). Judge Bibas dissented from a majority opinion that upheld New Jersey's ban on large capacity magazines for firearms. Bibas criticized the majority for failing to respect the right to bear arms guaranteed by the Second Amendment, writing that it is "an equal part of the Bill of Rights," which, like other enumerated constitutional rights, requires heightened judicial scrutiny.

District court opinions 
Judge Bibas sits by designation routinely in the District of Delaware and occasionally in the Eastern District of Pennsylvania. Some of his notable opinions are:

 Gibbs v. Carney, 2022 WL 3681327 (D. Del. 2022). Delaware prisoners alleged that their prison violated the Eighth Amendment during the COVID-19 pandemic by denying them masks and punishing them for wearing makeshift ones. Judge Bibas dismissed some of their claims but allowed the suit to go forward against the prison warden. The prisoners had plausibly alleged that the warden had “unreasonably failed to intervene to enforce the [prison’s mask] mandate.”
 Consumer Financial Protection Bureau v. National Collegiate Master Student Loan Trust, 575 F. Supp. 3d 505 (D. Del. 2021). The CFPB sued some student trusts for “engaging in forbidden debt-collection and litigation practices.” Over the trusts’ objections, Judge Bibas allowed the suit to go forward. The trusts had argued that the suit was improper because the CFPB filed it when its director had been unconstitutionally insulated from presidential removal. But Judge Bibas rejected that argument: “[S]o long as the agency head was properly appointed,” his actions were not automatically void. Instead, the trusts would need to “show that the removal provision harmed [them].” Here, the trusts could not show that.
 Ninivaggi v. University of Delaware, 555 F. Supp. 3d 44 (D. Del. 2021). Judge Bibas heard a case brought by University of Delaware students whose classes went online because of the COVID-19 pandemic. They sued the school for a tuition refund, claiming that it had not given them the in-person education that it had promised. Judge Bibas ruled that the students had stated a plausible contract claim, so he let the case go forward. He explained that although the school had not expressly promised in-person classes, it may have impliedly promised that.
 Avenatti v. Fox News Network, LLC, 2021 WL 3603035 (D. Del. 2021). Judge Bibas dismissed a libel lawsuit brought by celebrity lawyer Michael Avenatti. Avenatti alleged that Fox News and its correspondents had defamed him by reporting on his arrest for domestic violence. But because Avenatti is a public figure, Judge Bibas reasoned, Avenatti had to show actual malice—that the defendants “knew that the statements were false or recklessly disregarded that possibility.” Since none of the statements Avenatti identified met that standard (and some were not even false), the case had to be dismissed.

Clerks 
Judge Bibas is one of the top judges for “feeding” his clerks to the United States Supreme Court. Six of his law clerks have been hired to clerk for six different Supreme Court Justices (Chief Justice Roberts and Justices Thomas, Alito, Kagan, Gorsuch, and Barrett). Another of his clerks served as a Bristow Fellow in the Office of the Solicitor General.

Personal life
Bibas has made some donations to Republicans. He was a member of the Federalist Society from 1991 to 2017.  He has also served as a deacon of the Russian Orthodox Church since 2015.

See also
 List of law clerks of the Supreme Court of the United States (Seat 1)

References

Selected publications
 Rebooting Justice: More Technology, Fewer Lawyers, and the Future of Law (Encounter Books 2017) : exploring the use of technology and procedural innovation to simplify and streamline complex court procedures to create a cheaper, simpler, faster justice system to control costs.
Supreme Court, 2011 Term—Comment: Incompetent Plea Bargaining and Extrajudicial Reforms, 126 Harv. L. Rev. 150 (2012): assessing the Supreme Court's recent plea-bargaining jurisprudence and predicting how judicial rulings will likely spur nonjudicial actors to better regulate plea bargaining.
 Machinery of Criminal Justice (Oxford Univ. Press, 2012) : book about how criminal justice has moved from a lay-driven public morality play to a hidden, amoral, lawyer-run, plea-bargaining assembly line; what the US has lost in its quest for efficiency; and how the nation could swing the pendulum partway back toward greater transparency and public involvement.
 Plea Bargaining Outside the Shadow of Trial (117 Harv. L. Rev.2463 (2004)): explores the agency costs, structural forces, and psychological biases that cause plea bargaining to deviate from expected trial outcomes.
 Integrating Remorse and Apology into Criminal Procedure (114 Yale L.J. 85 (2004)), coauthored with Richard Bierschbach: advocates reforming criminal procedure to encourage more remorse, apology, and reconciliation.
 Prosecutorial Regulation Versus Prosecutorial Accountability (157 U. Pa. L. Rev. 959 (2009)): explores the difficulties with external regulation of prosecutors by legislatures, judges, and bar authorities, and instead proposes ways to make head prosecutors more accountable to the public and to reform the inner workings of prosecutors' offices.

Videos
 
 Penn Law Celebrates Stephanos Bibas' Confirmation to the Third Circuit (5:48 min). YouTube.com

External links
 
 
 Appearances at the U.S. Supreme Court from the Oyez Project
 SSRN Author's Page

1969 births
Living people
20th-century American lawyers
21st-century American lawyers
21st-century American judges
Alumni of University College, Oxford
American legal scholars
Scholars of criminal law
American people of Greek descent
Assistant United States Attorneys
Columbia College (New York) alumni
Federalist Society members
Judges of the United States Court of Appeals for the Third Circuit
Law clerks of the Supreme Court of the United States
Lawyers from Philadelphia
Pennsylvania lawyers
United States court of appeals judges appointed by Donald Trump
University of Chicago Law School faculty
University of Iowa College of Law faculty
University of Pennsylvania Law School faculty
Yale Law School alumni
People associated with Covington & Burling
Russian Orthodox clergy
Clinical legal faculty
Jurisprudence academics